The Yellowknife greenstone belt, also called the Yellowknife Volcanic Belt, is an Archean greenstone belt in the southern Slave craton, Northwest Territories, Canada. It is mostly made of mafic volcanic rocks (basalt and andesite)  and is bordered to the east by batholithic intrusions of the Western Granodiorite Complex and beyond to the north by the Duckfish Lake Granite. Intrusive equivalents (gabbro and diorite) are collectively known as the Kam Group. Most of the Yellowknife townsite and the Con and Giant gold mines are within the Kam Group. The Yellowknife greenstone belt stands out as a positive topographic feature.

See also
List of volcanoes in Canada
Volcanism of Canada
Volcanism of Northern Canada
Geography of the Northwest Territories
List of greenstone belts

Greenstone belts
Volcanism of the Northwest Territories
Archean volcanism